Gonatista grisea, common name grizzled mantis or lichen mimic, is a species of praying mantis native to the southern United States, primarily Florida.

See also
List of mantis genera and species

References

 Dichotomous Key to Species of Mantids that may occur in Florida

Mantidae
Mantodea of North America
Insects of the United States
Fauna of the Southeastern United States
Insects described in 1793